The Newton's Institute of Engineering, Macherla is a college founded in 2001, located in Macherla, Andhra Pradesh, India. The college offers courses in engineering and management, and is under the administration of Jawaharlal Nehru Technological University, Hyderabad.This is one of the prestigious Engineering institutions in Macherla.

Location
The institute is located in Macherla, a small town in Guntur district.

Courses offered

Computer Science & Engineering (C.S.E) - 120 seats.
Information Technology (IT) - 90 seats
Electronics & Communication Engineering (E.C.E) - 120 seats
Electrical & Electronics Engineering (E.E.E) - 60 seats
Master of Computer Applications (M.C.A.) – 60 seats
Master of Business Administration (M.B.A.) – 60 seats

References

External links
Newtons Institute home page

Engineering colleges in Andhra Pradesh
Universities and colleges in Guntur district
Educational institutions established in 2001
2001 establishments in Andhra Pradesh